UTV World Movies was an Indian television channel dedicated to world cinema and was part of the UTV Software Communications network. It broadcast films of several languages along with English subtitles. UTV World Movies was launched on 22 February 2008 at the same time as UTV Movies which was dedicated to Bollywood films.

References

External links

Official website
UTV Software Communications Ltd.

Television stations in Mumbai
Television channels and stations established in 2008
Defunct television channels in India
UTV Software Communications
Disney India Media Networks
Television channels and stations disestablished in 2014
2008 establishments in India
2008 establishments in Maharashtra
2014 disestablishments in India